The Fine Feathers is a 1912 silent film dramatic short directed by and starring Lois Weber. It was produced the Rex Motion Picture Company and distributed six months before the formation of Universal Film Manufacturing Company.

This film is preserved in the Library of Congress collection.

Cast
Phillips Smalley - Arthur Vaughn
Lois Weber - The Artist's Model
Charles De Forrest -

References

External links
The Fine Feathers at IMDb.com

1912 films
American silent short films
Films directed by Lois Weber
Universal Pictures short films
American black-and-white films
1912 short films
1912 drama films
Silent American drama films
1910s American films
1910s English-language films